Remixed and Reimagined is the first album in the Legacy Remixed series released by Sony BMG. This is a collection of songs by Nina Simone, remixed by several Electronica artists. All original songs come from her albums released by RCA records. It was released in 2006 on Legacy/RCA/SBMG Records.

The Groovefinder remix of "Ain't Got No, I Got Life" reached number 30 in the UK and remained on the charts for 16 weeks. In Ireland it peaked at number 9 and remained on the charts for 15 weeks.

Track listing
"I Can't See Nobody (Daniel Y. Remix)" – 3:06
"Funkier than a Mosquito's Tweeter (Jazzeem's All Styles Remix)" – 5:23
"Ain't Got No/I Got Life (Groovefinder Remix)" – 3:19
"Save Me (Coldcut Remix)" – 6:36
"Turn Me On (Tony Humphries Got U Turned On Dub)" – 7:58
"Here Comes the Sun (François K. Remix)" – 8:56
"Westwind (Organica Remix)" – 4:26
"Go to Hell (Mowo Remix)" – 4:33
"My Man's Gone Now (DJ Wally Remix)" – 4:05
"The Look of Love (Madison Park vs. Lenny B. Remix)" – 3:43
"O-o-h, Child (Nickodemus Remix)" – 3:32
"To Love Somebody (Chris Coco's Stadium Rocker Remix)" – 5:39
"Obeah Woman (DJ Logic Remix)" – 4:57
"I Wish I Knew How It Would Feel To Be Free (Ralphi Rosario & Craig J. Rival Vox Remix)" - 3:50 (UK bonus track)
"Turn Me On (Tony Humphries’s Full Vocal Mix)" – 8:40 (only available at iTunes)
"O-o-h, Child (Nickodemus’s Shufflin’ Only Mix)"  – 3:32 (only available at iTunes)
"Obeah Woman (DJ Logic’s Instru-Jammin’ Mix)" – 4:56 (only available at iTunes)

Charts

References 

2006 remix albums
Nina Simone remix albums
Legacy Recordings remix albums
RCA Records remix albums
Sony Music remix albums